Stuart Berg Flexner (1928–1990) was a lexicographer, editor and author, noted for his books on the origins of American words and expressions, including I Hear America Talking and Listening to America; as co-editor of the Dictionary of American Slang and as chief editor of the Random House Dictionary, Second Edition.

Personal life
Flexner was the son of David Flexner and Gertrude Berg. He was twice married, first to Miriam Bogen and then to Doris Louise Hurcomb.

Bibliography
 How to Increase Your Word Power (1971)
 Family Word Finder: A New Thesaurus of Synonyms and Antonyms in Dictionary Form (1975)
 I Hear America Talking: An Illustrated Treasury of American Words and Phrases (1976)
 Listening to America: An Illustrated History of Words and Phrases from our Lively and Splendid Past (1982)
 Dictionary of American Slang, with Harold Wentworth  (editions 1960, 1967, 1975)
 Oxford American Dictionary, with Eugene H. Ehrlich, Gorton Carruth,  Joyce M. Hawkins  (1980)   
 The Random House Thesaurus, with Jess Stein (1984)   
 The Pessimist's Guide To History : An Irresistible Compendium Of Catastrophes, Barbarities, Massacres And Mayhem From The Big Bang To The New Millennium,  with Doris Flexner (1992) 2nd edition (2000) 3rd edition (2008)
 The Random House Dictionary of the English Language, Unabridged, Second Edition, editor (1987)
 Wise Words and Wives' Tales: The Origins, Meanings and Time-Honored Wisdom of Proverbs and Folk Sayings Olde and New, (1993)
 Speaking Freely: A Guided Tour of American English from Plymouth Rock to Silicon Valley, with Anne H. Soukhanov (1997)

References

External links
 1987 audio interview with Stuart Flexner at Wired for Books.org by Don Swaim

American lexicographers
1928 births
1990 deaths
20th-century American non-fiction writers
Cornell University alumni
20th-century American male writers
American male non-fiction writers
20th-century lexicographers